Chef Aid: The South Park Album is a 1998 soundtrack album based on the American animated comedy series South Park. Several well-known artists perform on the record, which was mainly produced by Rick Rubin. Chef Aid contains a number of songs from and inspired by the show, while other songs are largely independent from South Park. The album was released during the show's second season, shortly after the broadcast of the episode called "Chef Aid", which features many of the stars and songs that appear on the recording. Soul singer Isaac Hayes appears in character as Chef throughout the album, which mimicks a live concert.

Chef Aid: The South Park Album was made available in 3 different versions: "Clean", "Explicit", and "Extreme". The Explicit version contains profanities (including "fuck") and carries a Parental Advisory sticker, but it is still censored, even for lesser profanities, such as "goose shit". The Extreme version is completely uncensored.

Songs and concept
There are several kinds of songs that appear on Chef Aid: The South Park Album. These include songs featured in the series, and sung by South Park characters or various artists. Other songs have been inspired by the series, with some written by the song's performer artist. The remainder of the songs are largely unrelated to South Park, although some of them have appeared on the corresponding "Chef Aid" episode.

Many of the South Park-related tracks on the album were written by show co-creator Trey Parker, and are extended versions of original songs from the series. A large portion of these, such as "Chocolate Salty Balls", are sung by soul singer Isaac Hayes, in character as Chef, the school cafeteria worker who often breaks into soul songs on the show. Other characters that appear on the record include the main boys—Stan, Kyle, Cartman and Kenny—as well as Ned Gerblansky. As on the show, the characters are voiced by the two creators; Stan, Cartman and Ned are voiced by Trey Parker, whereas Kyle and Kenny are voiced by Matt Stone.

A dramatization performed during the song Horny indicates that the song was included under protest.

The album is presented as a live concert. Chef performs most of the show's original songs, and also sings some lines on most of the other tracks, as well as acting as announcer between songs.

Track listing

Episode reference

Singles 
 "Chocolate Salty Balls (P.S. I Love You)"
 CD1
 "Chocolate Salty Balls (P.S. I Love You)" – Performed By Chef
 "Oh Holy Night" (Snippet) – Performed By Eric Cartman
 "Oh Little Town Of Bethlehem" (Snippet) – Performed By Ned Gerblanksy

 CD2
 "Chocolate Salty Balls (P.S. I Love You)" – Performed By Chef
 "Come Sail Away" – Performed By Eric Cartman
 "Mentally Dull" (Think Tank Remix) – Performed By Vitro
 "Kenny's Dead"
 "Kenny's Dead" – Performed By Master P
 "Come Sail Away" – Performed By Eric Cartman
 "Tonight Is Right For Love" – Performed By Chef and Meat Loaf
 "Simultaneous"
 CD1
 "Simultaneous" – Performed By Chef
 "Kyle's Mom's A Big Fat Bitch" (In D Minor) – Performed By Eric Cartman

 CD2
 "Simultaneous" – Performed By Chef
 "Cheesy Poofs" (Theme) – Performed By Eric Cartman
 "Come Sail Away" – Performed By Eric Cartman
 "My Best Friends" (Snippet) – Performed By Eric Cartman
 "Stinky Britches" (Snippet) – Performed By Chef
 "Bubblegoose"
 "Bubblegoose" (Remix) – Performed By Wyclef Jean, Cartman, Kenny, Stan & Kyle
 "Come Sail Away" – Performed By Eric Cartman
 "No Substitute" – Performed By Chef
 "Nowhere To Run"
 "Nowhere To Run" (Vapour Trail) – Performed By Ozzy Osbourne & DMX
 "Will They Die 4 You?" – Performed By P Diddy & Lil' Kim & System Of A Down

Chart performance
The album spent two weeks at number 2 on the UK Compilation Chart, held off by Now 41.

Charts

Weekly charts

Year-end charts

Certifications and sales

References 

Albums produced by Rick Rubin
South Park albums
1998 soundtrack albums
1998 compilation albums
Television animation soundtracks
Columbia Records soundtracks
American Recordings (record label) soundtracks